Tullycarnet Football Club is a Northern Irish, intermediate football club playing in Division 1C of the Northern Amateur Football League. The club is based in Dundonald, County Down. It joined the Amateur League in 2011. The club plays in the Irish Cup.

References

Association football clubs in Northern Ireland
Association football clubs in County Down
Northern Amateur Football League clubs